is a Japanese handball player who plays for the club Osaka Lovvits. She is also member of the Japanese national team. She competed at the 2005 World Women's Handball Championship in Russia, and at the 2015 World Women's Handball Championship in Denmark.

References

1975 births
Living people
Japanese female handball players
Asian Games medalists in handball
Handball players at the 1994 Asian Games
Handball players at the 1998 Asian Games
Handball players at the 2002 Asian Games
Asian Games silver medalists for Japan
Asian Games bronze medalists for Japan
Medalists at the 1994 Asian Games
Medalists at the 1998 Asian Games
20th-century Japanese women
21st-century Japanese women